The 2008 Northwestern Wildcats football team represented Northwestern University in the Big Ten Conference during the 2008 NCAA Division I FBS football season.  Pat Fitzgerald, in his third season at Northwestern, was the team's head coach.  The Wildcats played their homes games at Ryan Field in Evanston, Illinois.

Previous season
The 2007 team finished the season with a win–loss record of 6–6 and did not receive a bowl invitation.

Schedule

Game summaries

Syracuse

Duke

Southern Illinois

Ohio

Iowa

Michigan State

Purdue

Indiana

Minnesota

Ohio State

Michigan

Illinois

Alamo Bowl, v. Missouri

Rankings

Statistics

Team

Scores by quarter

Offense

Rushing

Passing

Receiving

Defense

Special teams

References

Northwestern
Northwestern Wildcats football seasons
Northwestern Wildcats football